The Pretenders is a 2018 American drama film directed by James Franco from a screenplay by Josh Boone. It stars Jack Kilmer, Jane Levy, Shameik Moore, Juno Temple, Brian Cox, Dennis Quaid and Franco.

It had its world premiere at the Torino Film Festival on November 24, 2018. It was released on September 27, 2019, by Cleopatra Entertainment.

Cast
 Jack Kilmer as Terry
 Jane Levy as Catherine
 Shameik Moore as Phil
 Juno Temple as Victoria
 Brian Cox as Henry
 Dennis Quaid as Joe
 James Franco as Maxwell
 Mustafa Shakir as Mr. Stanish
 Danielle Burgess as Madeline
 Antoni Porowski as Antoni
 Jacqueline Honulik as Kim
 Tyler Alvarez as Doug

Production
In November 2016, it was announced James Franco would direct the film, from a screenplay by Josh Boone, with Franco, Jack Kilmer, Shameik Moore, Jane Levy, Brian Cox and Juno Temple joining the cast of the film. Vince Jolivette, Jay Davis, Shaun Sanghani, Jordan Yale Levine, Scott Levenson and Katie Leary served as producers on the film under their Rabbit Bandini Productions, SSS Entertainment and Yale Productions banners, respectively.

Release
The film had its world premiere at the Torino Film Festival on November 24, 2018. Shortly after, Cleopatra Entertainment acquired distribution rights to the film. It was released on September 27, 2019.

Reception 
On review aggregator Rotten Tomatoes, 20% of 10 reviews are positive, and the average rating is 4.3/10. On Metacritic — which assigns a weighted mean score — the film has a score of 14 out of 100 based on 5 critics, indicating "overwhelming dislike".

References

External links

2018 films
2018 drama films
American drama films
Films directed by James Franco
Films about actors
Films about infidelity
Films about photographers
Films about prostitution in the United Kingdom
Films about prostitution in the United States
Films about screenwriters
Films set in 1979
Films set in 1983
Films set in 1986
Films set in France
Films set in London
Films set in New York (state)
Films shot in New York (state)
HIV/AIDS in American films
2010s English-language films
2010s American films